A Knickerbocker is a person from Manhattan (New York City, before 1898). A modern synonym is “New Yorker”.

Knickerbocker or Knickerbockers may also refer to:

People
 Knickerbocker (surname), including a list of people with the surname, and an explanation of the term's 19th-century popularity

Groups
 Knickerbocker Dutch, a Dutch-speaking cultural group native to New York and New Jersey
 A resident of New York City
 Manhattanite, a resident of Manhattan

Writers
 Knickerbocker Group, consisting of Washington Irving and other frequent contributors to The Knickerbocker  literary magazine
 Cholly Knickerbocker, a pseudonym used by a series of society columnists in the New York American and the New York Journal-American
 Diedrich Knickerbocker, a pseudonym of Washington Irving
 Hubert Renfro Knickerbocker, American writer and journalist
 Suzy Knickerbocker, a pseudonym of columnist Aileen Mehle

Historical events
 Knickerbocker Crisis, a financial crisis in the United States in 1907
 Knickerbocker storm, a 1922 blizzard
 Knickerbocker Case, a 1940s investigation of antisemitism at the City College of New York

Arts and media

Film, television, and theatre
 Knickerbocker Holiday, a 1938 musical by Kurt Weill and Maxwell Anderson
 The Knick, an American television drama series at the Knickerbocker Hospital
 The Knickerbocker Buckaroo, a 1919 American silent film starring Douglas Fairbanks

Music
 The Knickerbockers, an American music group best known for their 1965 hit "Lies"
 The Knickerbockers, an alias of Ben Selvin and His Orchestra
 "Knickerbocker", a 2008 song by Fujiya & Miyagi
 "Hey, Mr. Knickerbocker", a children's song popularized on Barney & Friends

Publications
 The Knickerbocker or New-York Monthly Magazine (1833–1865), a literary magazine founded by Charles Fenno Hoffman
 The Knickerbocker Gang, a series of children's books by Austrian writer Thomas Brezina, and a TV series based on the books
 Knickerbocker News, a newspaper in Albany, New York published between 1843 and 1988

Buildings and infrastructure

New York
Knickerbocker Avenue (BMT Myrtle Avenue Line), a New York City subway station
Knickerbocker Field Club, an tennis clubhouse in Flatbush, Brooklyn
Knickerbocker and Arnink Garages, two stone buildings on Hudson Avenue in Albany, New York
Knickerbocker Mansion, Schaghticoke, Rensselaer County, New York
Knickerbocker Theatre (Broadway)
Knickerbocker Hospital, Harlem, New York, closed in 1979
The Knickerbocker Hotel (Manhattan), New York City
Knickerbocker Village, a housing project in New York City
United States Post Office–Knickerbocker Station, a post office in New York City
Times Union Center, formerly the Knickerbocker Arena, Albany, New York

Elsewhere
Knickerbocker (Spokane, Washington), a building
Knickerbocker Bicycle Bridge, a bridge across the Willamette River in Eugene, Oregon
Knickerbocker Theatre (Washington, D.C.)
Knickerbocker Hotel (Los Angeles), now Hollywood Knickerbocker Apartments
Knickerbocker Hotel (Milwaukee, Wisconsin), also known as Knickerbocker on the Lake
Knickerbocker Apartments (Kansas City, Missouri), demolished in 2020

Organizations

 Knickerbocker Club, a private male-only social club in New York City
 Knickerbocker Greys, an afterschool program in New York City
 Knickerbocker Ice Company, based in New York State during the 19th century
 Knickerbocker News, a newspaper in Albany, New York published between 1843 and 1988
 Knickerbocker Press, a division of publisher G. P. Putnam's Sons
 Knickerbocker Sailing Association, a gay, lesbian, bisexual, and transgender sailing club in New York City
 Knickerbocker Trust Company, a bank whose failure triggered the Panic of 1907
 Knickerbocker Yacht Club, a defunct yacht club in Port Washington, New York
 SKDKnickerbocker, a public affairs and consulting firm

Sport

Sports teams
 Knickerbocker Athletic Club football team, an early-20th-century American football team
 New York Knickerbockers, one of the first baseball teams
 New York Knicks (short for "Knickerbockers"), a National Basketball Association team
 Westchester Knicks, a minor league basketball affiliate of the New York Knicks
 Warwickshire Knickerbockers, a cricket team that participated in first game of cricket in France

Other uses in sport
 Knickerbocker Rules, early rules of American baseball
 Knickerbocker Stakes, a horse race at Belmont Park

Other uses
 Knickerbockers (clothing), baggy knee trousers
 , a US Navy tug, minesweeper, and dispatch ship in commission from 1917 to 1919
 Knickerbocker glory, a layered ice cream sundae
 Knickerbocker, a New York Central train from St. Louis to New York City and Boston
 Knickerbocker, Texas

See also
Knickers, underwear worn by women
New Yorker (disambiguation)